The Houston Colt .45s' 1963 season was a season in American baseball. The team finished ninth in the National League with a record of 66–96, 33 games behind the Los Angeles Dodgers.

Offseason 
 November 1, 1962: Joe Morgan was signed as an amateur free agent by the Colt .45s.
 November 26, 1962: Conrad Cardinal was drafted by the Colt .45s from the Detroit Tigers in the 1962 first-year draft.
 November 26, 1962: Ellis Burton was drafted by the Colt .45s from the Milwaukee Braves in the 1962 rule 5 draft.
 November 26, 1962: Don Taussig was drafted from the Colt .45s by the Milwaukee Braves in the 1962 minor league draft.
 November 30, 1962: Joey Amalfitano was traded by the Colt .45s to the San Francisco Giants for Manny Mota and Dick LeMay.
 November 30, 1962: Norm Larker was traded by the Colt .45s to the Milwaukee Braves for Jim Bolger, Don Nottebart, and Connie Grob.
 March 28, 1963: Hal Haydel, Dick LeMay and Merritt Ranew were traded by the Colt .45s to the Chicago Cubs for Dave Gerard and Danny Murphy.

Regular season 
Broadcaster Harry Kalas made his major league debut in 1963 with Houston, replacing Al Helfer and working alongside Gene Elston and Loel Passe.

On May 17, Don Nottebart pitched the first no-hitter for an expansion team when Houston defeated Philadelphia by a score of 4–1.

Season standings

Record vs. opponents

Notable transactions 
 April 2, 1963: Ellis Burton was purchased from the Colt .45s by the Cleveland Indians.
 April 4, 1963: Manny Mota was traded by the Colt .45s to the Pittsburgh Pirates for Howie Goss and cash.

Roster

Player stats

Batting

Starters by position 
Note: Pos = Position; G = Games played; AB = At bats; R = Runs scored; H = Hits; 2B = Doubles; 3B = Triples; Avg. = Batting average; HR = Home runs; RBI = Runs batted in; SB = Stolen basesPositional abbreviations: C = Catcher; 1B = First base; 2B = Second base; 3B = Third base; SS = Shortstop; LF = Left field; CF = Center field; RF = Right field

Other batters 
Note: G = Games played; AB = At bats; R = Runs scored; H = Hits; 2B = Doubles; 3B = Triples; Avg. = Batting average; HR = Home runs; RBI = Runs batted in; SB = Stolen bases

Pitching

Starting pitchers 
Note: G = Games pitched; GS = Games started; IP = Innings pitched; W = Wins; L = Losses; ERA = Earned run average; R = Runs allowed; ER = Earned runs allowed; BB = Walks allowed; K = Strikeouts

Other pitchers 
Note: G = Games pitched; GS = Games started; IP = Innings pitched; W = Wins; L = Losses; SV = Saves; ERA = Earned run average; R = Runs allowed; ER = Earned runs allowed; BB = Walks allowed; K = Strikeouts

Relief pitchers 
Note: G = Games pitched; IP = Innings pitched; W = Wins; L = Losses; SV = Saves; ERA = Earned run average; R = Runs allowed; ER = Earned runs allowed; BB = Walks allowed; K = Strikeouts

Awards and honors 
All-Star Game
Hal Woodeshick, reserve

Farm system 

LEAGUE CHAMPIONS: Oklahoma City

References

External links
1963 Houston Colt .45s season at Baseball Reference
1963 Houston Colt .45s season at retrosheet.org (Archived 2009-05-04)

Houston Astros seasons
Houston Colt .45s season
Houston Astro